Eleven is a fictional character and one of the protagonists of the Netflix science fiction horror drama series Stranger Things, written and produced by the Duffer Brothers. She is primarily portrayed by British actress Millie Bobby Brown. Eleven has psychokinetic and telepathic abilities, and is considered the breakout character of Stranger Things. After being adopted by chief of police Jim Hopper, her legal name becomes Jane Hopper.

Fictional character biography 
Eleven is the daughter of Teresa "Terry" Ives, and a participant in the Project MKUltra experiments conducted by the Central Intelligence Agency (CIA). Eleven appears to have been born a psychic with notable telekinetic and extrasensory abilities. However, when she uses these abilities to a significant degree, she becomes temporarily weakened and her nose bleeds. At birth, Eleven was taken away from her mother by Dr. Martin Brenner and was raised as a test subject in Hawkins National Laboratory in order to develop her psychokinetic skills. When placed in a sensory deprivation tank, she can use remote viewing to access other dimensions, primarily for the purposes of espionage. In addition, Eleven can open and close portals, known as “Gates”, to a parallel dimension called the Upside Down.

Season 1 

In the first season, Eleven escapes from Hawkins National Laboratory and attempts to steal food from a local restaurant. The owner, Benny, takes pity on her and calls social services. The responding social worker, who turns out to be an agent sent from Hawkins Laboratory, kills Benny; Eleven then flees before she can be taken again. She is encountered by Mike Wheeler (Finn Wolfhard), Dustin Henderson (Gaten Matarazzo) and Lucas Sinclair (Caleb McLaughlin), who are looking for their missing friend, Will Byers (Noah Schnapp). The boys learn that her name is Eleven based on a "011" tattoo found on her left forearm. Mike decides to call her "El" for short, and allows Eleven to live in his basement. Fearing recapture, Eleven convinces Mike not to tell any adults so Dr. Brenner, whom she calls “Papa”, cannot find her.

Eleven helps to locate Will and determines that he is trapped in a parallel dimension, which the children dub the “Upside Down”, where he is being hunted by a creature they call the “Demogorgon”. The group sets out to find Will using their compasses, but Eleven interferes with their search when she realizes they are being led towards Hawkins Laboratory. Lucas, noticing her deception, becomes angry at her; she ends up knocking him unconscious and fleeing. She later steals frozen waffles from a grocery store and eats them in the forest. Mike and Dustin are later threatened by bullies; Mike is forced to jump off a high cliff into a lake while Dustin is held hostage. Eleven returns and intervenes before Mike hits the water, frightening the bullies and saving both Mike and Dustin.

Eleven, Mike, and Dustin reunite with Lucas and make amends. They travel to the town junkyard with Dr. Brenner and his associates in close pursuit. During the chase, a government van catches up to the children; Eleven uses her powers to flip the van through the air, blocking the convoy’s path and allowing the group to flee. They are then joined by Joyce Byers (Winona Ryder), Hawkins police chief Jim Hopper (David Harbour), Nancy Wheeler (Natalia Dyer), and Jonathan Byers (Charlie Heaton). Together, they create a makeshift isolation tank with a pool and bags of salt in order to help Eleven access the Upside Down. Eleven, using her powers, confirms that Will is alive, but says that Barb, Nancy’s friend taken shortly after Will, is “gone”. As government forces close in on the school, Mike tells Eleven she can be a part of his family; he then asks her to the school dance, and kisses her after struggling to explain his feelings. Eleven later helps the group escape by using her powers to kill most of the agents. After the Demogorgon makes its way into their dimension, Eleven seemingly sacrifices herself to destroy the creature and save her friends.

One month later, after a Christmas party, Hopper leaves the police station and drives to the woods. There, he leaves waffles in a concealed box. Eleven's condition and location are left ambiguous.

Season 2 

After defeating the Demogorgon, Eleven wakes up in the Upside Down. She escapes through a portal, which leads her back to Hawkins Middle School. With the government still searching for her, she is forced to hide in the forest. Eleven eventually finds the Eggos Hopper has left for her and seeks him out. The two move into a fortified cabin in the woods where he forbids her to leave, fearing for her safety. Hopper hides Eleven indoors for almost a year, concealing her survival and whereabouts from everyone, including the children. During this time, Eleven gains better control over her powers; she is less weakened by the use of her telekinesis, and she is now able to project her mind without the use of a sensory deprivation tank. She uses the latter ability to listen to Mike's attempts to contact her, though she is increasingly frustrated at her inability to reply. Eleven also significantly expands her vocabulary during this time, learning from both Hopper and television.

Eleven becomes restless and longs to reunite with Mike and his friends, which causes tension between her and Hopper. One day, she runs away from home and travels to Hawkins Middle School. When she finds Mike with Max Mayfield (Sadie Sink), a new student, Eleven mistakenly thinks Max is flirting with Mike. Out of jealousy, she uses her powers to knock Max off her skateboard before leaving. Upon returning to the cabin, she gets into a heated argument with Hopper over her leaving without permission, ending with her angrily using her powers to damage the cabin. The next day, whilst cleaning the mess she made, Eleven looks through records in the cabin's basement and discovers that her birth mother Terry is alive, contradicting what Hopper and Dr. Brenner had told her. She runs away once again and hitchhikes to her mother’s residence, where she first meets her aunt Becky. Through Becky, Eleven find out what happened to Terry at Hawkins National Laboratory. While there, she realizes Terry is trying to communicate with her, but is unable to effectively do so due to her catatonic state. Eleven, using her powers, views a flashback from her mother. After her daughter was taken from her, Terry attempted to force her way into Hawkins National Laboratory to save her. As a response, Brenner and his assistants capture her and subject her head to 450 volts of electricity, resulting in her current condition.

Eleven then uses her abilities to find out she has a "sister"another gifted girl taken by Dr. Brenner for experimentationand sets out to find her.

Using her abilities once again, Eleven locates her sister and discovers that she is an older girl named Kali Prasad with the ID number 008, who has the ability to cause people to have visual hallucinations. Eleven stays with Kali and her friendsrunaways who are determined to take revenge on people who have hurt them. Kali teaches Eleven to focus on her anger to get the most out of her powers; she successfully uses this tactic to move a rail car, impressing Kali and eliciting cheers from the gang. Later, the group tracks down Ray Carroll, a former Hawkins Lab employee. When she discovers that he was one of the individuals responsible for Terry’s condition, Eleven begins to choke him to death in a rage. However, she stops upon realizing that he has two daughters, and ends up preventing Kali from shooting him. Back at the hideout, Eleven witnesses Hopper and Mike in danger through the void. While the gang are about to flee, Eleven realizes she needs to return to her friends to save them.

Eleven goes back to Hawkins and finally reunites with Mike with a heartfelt embrace and her friends after saving them from a Demodog. The group realizes that she needs to close the gate to the Upside Down, and she and Hopper head to Hawkins Laboratory. There, Eleven remembers Kali’s lessons and focuses her anger into her powers, closing the gate and draining her energy. Afterwards, Dr. Sam Owens (Paul Reiser) meets up with Hopper and hands him a forged birth certificate, which allows Hopper to legally adopt Eleven, and tells him that she must be hidden for at least a year to ensure her safety. However, on Owen’s advice, Hopper lets her attend the Snow Ball at Hawkins Middle School. She meets up with Mike, dances with him, and they share their first kiss as a couple.

Back in the Upside Down, the Mind Flayer observes El and her friends at the high school.

Season 3 

At the start of season three,  Eleven and Mike have been dating for seven months, much to the dismay of Hopper, who is annoyed that El and Mike are constantly together. When Hopper confesses to Joyce that he feels uncomfortable about the situation, she suggests that he sit down and calmly talk to El and Mike about how he feels. However, this backfires, and Hopper resorts to directly instructing Mike to stay away from Eleven, threatening to end their relationship if he does not comply. When Mike is forced to lie to Eleven about why he can no longer visit her, she becomes suspicious and seeks advice from Max, who asserts that Mike is pushing Eleven aside to spend time with the boys. To take her mind off of the situation, Max suggests that they have some fun of their own by going shopping at the newly-built Starcourt Mall.

The girls spend quality time together at the mall where they encounter Lucas, Will, and Mike attempting to buy Eleven a makeup present. When Mike lies and says the present is for his sick grandmother, Eleven breaks up with him on the spot, to Max’s delight and Mike’s shock. Eleven then leaves on a bus with Max, where the girls spend the night sleeping over at Hopper's house and use Eleven's psychic powers to spy on the boys. For their amusement, they create a game in which they spin a bottle and have Eleven observe whoever it lands on. When the bottle lands on Billy and he is watched, he appears to behave suspiciously and erratically. This concerns Eleven and Max enough that the two go out to the Hawkins Community Pool, where he works as a lifeguard, to look for him. In the process, they discover that Heather Holloway, one of Billy’s coworkers, has gone missing. They soon learn that Billy has been corrupted by the Mind Flayer, and is taking Heather to be assimilated.

They reunite with Mike, Lucas, and Will. Mike is annoyed that El would spy on him and has an argument with Max about his feelings for Eleven while she is spying on the Flayer. She holds off the Mind Flayer when the cabin is attacked, but the Flayer wounds her and leaves a piece of itself in the wound.  El and Mike make up, but the Mind Flayer and Billy track them due to El's wound. Eleven loses her powers after removing the piece of the monster from her leg, but helps Billy to break free of the Mind Flayer's possession by recalling his childhood memories. The group defeat the Mind Flayer by closing the portal to the Upside Down and with Billy's sacrifice. Hopper is presumed dead in the explosion that closes the gate and Eleven is taken in by the Byers. While the Byers are packing to leave Hawkins, El reveals to Mike that she also loves him, and they share a kiss. Joyce gives her a letter written by Hopper that he intended to use when talking to her and Mike about how he felt about them dating. Eleven and the Byers then leave Hawkins where Eleven cries as they drive away.

Season 4 

At the start of season four, Eleven begins going to school in California alongside Will and struggles with the loss of her powers, as well as being bullied by a girl named Angela (Elodie Grace Orkin). When Mike comes to visit, Eleven pretends she has many friends to please Mike, but she is humiliated at a roller rink and strikes Angela in the face in retaliation. She is taken into police custody, but Dr. Owens intercepts her arrest and takes her with him. He explains that Hawkins is in danger and he has been working in a program that may be able to bring back Eleven's powers. Eleven agrees to participate, risking that she may never see her friends ever again. Eleven is taken to a facility in Nevada and discovers Dr. Brenner is still alive.

Eleven is placed into a sensory deprivation tank (dubbed NINA) and relives her repressed memories of her time at Hawkins lab. Eleven attempts to escape the facility but discovers her powers are slowly returning, convincing her to stay. She discovers she was often ostracized by the other children, but a kindly orderly (Jamie Campbell Bower) watched over her and gave her advice on how to control her powers. The orderly, who is in fact subject One in Brenner's experiments, manipulated Eleven into removing an implant in his neck that suppressed his powers, then went on to massacre the rest of the children and staff in the lab. One later revealed himself to be Henry Creel, who killed his mother and sister in the 1950s and got his father arrested for it. Henry attempted to kill Eleven after she refused to help him eradicate humanity, but she overpowered him and sent him into the Upside Down, where he became Vecna. Brenner discovers Eleven at the scene of the massacre where she fell comatose and forgot the events. Brenner discovered the events through security cameras and made Eleven spy on Russians as a cover for searching for Henry.

Eleven discovers the Hawkins' groups plan to kill Vecna by using Max as bait to lure him out, and convinces Owens to help her return to Hawkins. However, Brenner locks up Owens and traps Eleven, placing a shock collar on her so she is unable to leave. When the army attack the base, Brenner flees with Eleven but is shot and incapacitated, however she is able to destroy the helicopter and vehicles as Mike, Will, Jonathan, and Argyle (Eduardo Franco) arrive. Brenner unlocks the collar and tells Eleven they are family, but she refuses to forgive him and he dies. The group go to Argyle's pizza place where they create an isolation tank for her to enter Max's mind at the same time as Vecna. Vecna overwhelms Eleven and breaks Max's bones and blinds her before Mike tells Eleven he loves her which gives her the strength to break his control. Despite her efforts, Max still dies from her injuries, but Eleven manages to use her powers to restart her heart and put her into a coma. The group return to Hawkins and Eleven reunites with Hopper. Will senses the Upside Down and they all discover that the Upside Down has taken over Hawkins.

Development

Conception and writing 
The Duffer Brothers based the character of Eleven on survivors of the Project MKUltra experiments, with influences from E.T. and the idea of being an outsider. They also drew inspiration from the anime Elfen Lied and Akira, saying they "wanted there to be a mystery in her past, and also have her seem a little scary." Originally planned as a feature film, Stranger Things was then pitched to Netflix as a limited series, and it was planned that Eleven would sacrifice herself in the last episode of the series. After Netflix was then keen for the show to be continued in a second season, the brothers decided to change the ending to keep the character alive.

Casting 
The brothers believed Eleven was the most difficult role to cast, as the character had few lines. They wanted a child actor who was able to convey much emotion. The Duffers were concerned they would not find someone who could stay in character when not speaking. The brothers were relieved after meeting Millie Bobby Brown, whom they described as "something special, alright, with a downright spooky preternatural talent." Brown had to shave her head for the role, something she and her parents were worried would "diminish her beauty" until shown a photo of Charlize Theron as Imperator Furiosa in Mad Max: Fury Road.

In other media 
Eleven makes a silent cameo appearance in Odder Stuff, an in-universe television series in The Simpsons thirtieth season episode "I'm Dancing as Fat as I Can", released February 10, 2019. Eleven's Stranger Things role is then embodied by Lisa Simpson (voiced by Yeardley Smith) in the 31st season "Treehouse of Horror XXX" segment "Danger Things", released October 20, 2019.

A violent parody of Eleven, Cindy, is portrayed by Ess Hödlmoser in the 2020 second season of the Amazon Prime Video streaming television series The Boys and the promotional web series Vought News Network: Seven on 7 with Cameron Coleman.

Reception 

The character and Brown's performance have received critical acclaim; Alice Vincent of The Daily Telegraph wrote:
"Millie Bobby Brown continues to be the star of the show: she has inspired fan art and tattoos, a worldwide acknowledgment of Eggos, the waffles her character devours and given a whole new life to the phrase 'mouth breather'". Ashley Hoffman of Time magazine recommended Eleven as a mascot for National Waffle Day.

However, Lenika Cruz of The Atlantic said that "despite a rich backstory, Eleven is the show's most thinly sketched protagonist".

At the 69th and 70th Primetime Emmy Awards in 2017 and 2018, Brown received a nomination for Outstanding Supporting Actress in a Drama Series. At the 2017 MTV Movie & TV Awards, she was nominated for Best Hero and Best Actor in a Show, winning the latter award. She won Best Performance by a Younger Actor in a Television Series at the 43rd Saturn Awards. She was twice nominated for the Screen Actors Guild Award for Outstanding Performance by a Female Actor in a Drama Series in 2017 and 2018. She won a Kids Choice Award for Best Female Actor in 2018 and 2020.

See also 
 List of Stranger Things characters
 Project MKUltra

References

External links 
 Eleven on IMDb

Adoptee characters in television
Child characters in television
Female characters in television
Fictional characters from Indiana
Fictional middle school students
Fictional psychics
Fictional telekinetics
Fictional telepaths
Horror television characters
Science fiction television characters
Stranger Things characters
Teenage characters in television
Television characters introduced in 2016